The Chinese Taipei Olympic flag is used by the Republic of China (ROC) Taiwan team, which competes under the title "Chinese Taipei" during the Olympic Games and other events, in place of the flag of the Republic of China. This is a result of the complex Cross-Strait relations between the Republic of China and the People's Republic of China. The Olympic flag has been in use since 1981, following the decision by the International Olympic Committee that the ROC could not compete under the country's name or flag.

Due to this restriction, the National Anthem of the Republic of China also could not be played when the team wins medals, so, instead, the National Flag Anthem of the Republic of China was played during the flag raising of the medal ceremony.

The flag shows the Blue Sky with a White Sun (the emblem of the Republic of China and the Kuomintang) and the Olympic rings, encircled by a five-petaled Prunus mei (the ROC's national flower) drawn in red, white, and blue (the colors of the ROC flag).

In addition to its use in the Olympics, some companies operating in mainland China use the Chinese Taipei flag in place of the ROC flag to represent Taiwan since the PRC does not recognize the ROC.

Court case over IOC decision 
The IOC adopted the Nagoya Resolution in November 1979 which called for the "Republic of China Olympic Committee" to change its name to the "Chinese Taipei Olympic Committee" and adopt a new flag and anthem if it wanted to participate in the Olympic Games. The ROC strongly disagreed with the decision and sued the IOC in Switzerland. The ROC claimed that the conditions concerning its name, flag, and anthem violated articles 6, 64, and 66 of the Olympic Charter. However, despite appealing an initial court judgment, the ROC was not successful. On 15 January 1980, a Swiss court rejected the ROC effort to remain in the Olympic movement under the name of "Republic of China."

After a series of forceful objections, Taiwan officially accepted the compromise in 1981, and the island competed in the 1984 Winter Olympics in Sarajevo, SFR Yugoslavia.

Other flags 
For other Olympic-affiliated and international sporting events, Taiwan uses variations on the Olympic flag:
 The Paralympic flag replaces the Olympic rings with the logo of the International Paralympic Committee
Starting at the 2019 Winter Deaflympics a new flag replaced the Olympic rings with the Deaflympics logo. A prior version instead featured a green Chinese dragon and the name "Chinese Taipei" on lower part from the symbol.
 Prior to 2006, the flag of the Chinese Taipei national football team replaced the Olympic rings with the taijitu (the yin and yang symbol), with the black and white dots replaced with footballs and has a yellow background.
 The Universiade flag replaces the Olympic rings with the letter U (from the logo of the FISU) and has an electric blue background.
 The  World School Sport Games flag replace the Olympic Rings with a pictogram 中 and a letter V in latin script for the victory word.
 The flag of both the Chinese Taipei men's national volleyball team and Chinese Taipei women's national volleyball team replaces the Olympic rings with a volleyball-playing figure and the abbreviation of the Chinese Taipei Volleyball Association.

Gallery

Current flags

Former flags

Other flags

See also 
 Chinese Taipei at the Olympics
 Chinese Taipei Olympic Committee

References 

Flags of Taiwan
Flags introduced in 1981